Michael R. Carman (died May 6, 2009) was a Canadian lawyer who specialized in structured finance. He was a partner with the a corporate law firm Stikeman Elliott since 1992. Carman was recognized as Canada's top lawyer in his field, and as one of the 25 leading structured finance lawyers in the world. The Canadian LEXPERT legal directory listed Carman as the most frequently recommended lawyer in the fields of derivatives and securitization.

Background
Carman was called to the Ontario Bar in 1984. He graduated from York University with a Bachelor of Arts in 1975, and received his Bachelor of Laws from the University of Western Ontario in 1982.

Carman died on May 6, 2009, after a long battle with cancer.

Legacy
The 'Michael R. Carman Field House and Batting Cage' at Kirkey Field in Pickering, Ontario is named in his honour.

Footnotes

References
The Euromoney Legal Media Group's guide: The Best of the Best
An International Who's Who of Securitization Lawyers 2001 (Law Business Research)
The International Who's Who of Business Lawyers (Law Business Research)
A Guide to the Leading 500 Lawyers in Canada (LEXPERT/American Lawyer Media publication)

Lawyers in Ontario
York University alumni
University of Western Ontario alumni
2009 deaths
Year of birth missing